(born 16 January 1981) is a Japanese speed skater. He competed in the 2006 and the 2010 Winter Olympics, and has qualified for the 2014 Winter Olympics in Sochi.

References 

1981 births
Japanese male speed skaters
Speed skaters at the 2006 Winter Olympics
Speed skaters at the 2010 Winter Olympics
Speed skaters at the 2014 Winter Olympics
Olympic speed skaters of Japan
Speed skaters at the 2007 Asian Winter Games
Medalists at the 2007 Asian Winter Games
Asian Games gold medalists for Japan
Asian Games bronze medalists for Japan
Sportspeople from Hokkaido
Living people
Asian Games medalists in speed skating
World Single Distances Speed Skating Championships medalists